Hungary competed at the 2008 Summer Paralympics in Beijing.

Medalists

Sports

Boccia

Judo

Men

Women

Powerlifting

Sailing

One Hungarian athlete competed in the following event in sailing:
 Single-Person Keelboat - 2.4mR

Shooting

Swimming

Men

Women

Table tennis

Wheelchair fencing

Pál Szekeres won his last competitive medal at his fifth and final consecutive Paralympics: he won a bronze medal in the men's foil.

Men

Women

Wheelchair tennis

See also
2008 Summer Paralympics
Hungary at the Paralympics
Hungary at the 2008 Summer Olympics

External links
Beijing 2008 Paralympic Games Official Site
International Paralympic Committee

References

Nations at the 2008 Summer Paralympics
2008
Paralympics